This is a list of main and recurring cast members in the Power Rangers franchise, broken down by seasons.

Mighty Morphin Power Rangers (1993-1995, 2023)
 Austin St. John – Jason Lee Scott
 Thuy Trang (deceased) – Trini Kwan
 Walter Emanuel Jones – Zachary "Zack" Taylor
 Amy Jo Johnson – Kimberly Ann Hart
 David Yost – Billy Cranston – Blue Ranger
 Jason David Frank (deceased) – Tommy Oliver
 Johnny Yong Bosch – Adam Park
 Karan Ashley – Aisha Campbell
 Steve Cardenas – Rocky DeSantos
 Catherine Sutherland – Katherine "Kat" Hillard
 Charlie Kersh - Minh
 Paul Schrier – Farkas "Bulk" Bulkmeier
 Jason Narvy – Eugene "Skull" Skullovitch
 Richard Genelle (deceased) – Ernie
 Gregg Bullock – Lt. Jerome Stone
 Royce Herron – Ms. Appleby
 Machiko Soga – Rita Repulsa [Zyuranger footage]
 Barbara Goodson – Rita Repulsa / Rita [voice actor]
 Ed Neil – Lord Zedd [suit actor]
 Robert Axelrod (deceased) – Lord Zedd & Finster [voice actor]
 Richard Steven Horvitz – Alpha 5 [voice actor]
 David Fielding – Zordon [Portrayal & Initially Voiced]
 Bob Manahan – Zordon [voice actor]
 Kerrigan Mahan – Goldar [voice actor]
 Ami Kawai – Scorpina [Zyuranger footage]
 Bob Papenbrook (deceased) – Rito Revolto [voice actor]
 Romy J. Sharf – Alpha 5 [suit actor]
 Audri Dubois – Trini Kwan [Pilot only]
 Ron Balicki – Stunts

Mighty Morphin Alien Rangers (1996)
 Rajia Baroudi – Delphine
 David Bacon – Aurico
 Alan Palmer – Corcus
 Karim Prince – Cestro
 Jim Gray – Tideus
 Michael R. Gotto – Young Tommy Oliver
 Michael J. O'Laskey – Young Rocky DeSantos
 Matthew Sakimoto – Young Adam Park
 Sicily Sewell – Young Aisha Campbell
 Julia Jordan – Young Katherine "Kat" Hillard
 Justin Timsit – Young Billy Cranston
 David Yost – Billy Cranston
 Cody Slaton (deceased) – Young Bulk
 Ross J. Samya – Young Skull

Power Rangers Zeo (1996)
 Catherine Sutherland – Katherine "Kat" Hillard
 Nakia Burrise – Tanya Sloan
 Steve Cardenas – Rocky DeSantos
 Johnny Yong Bosch – Adam Park
 Jason David Frank (deceased) – Tommy Oliver
 Austin St. John  – Jason Lee Scott
 David Yost – Billy Cranston
 Paul Schrier – Farkas "Bulk" Bulkmeier
 Jason Narvy – Eugene "Skull" Skullovitch 
 Richard Genelle (deceased) – Ernie
 Bob Manahan (deceased) – Zordon [voice actor]
 Gregg Bullock – Lt./Det. Jerome Stone
 Ed Neil – Lord Zedd [suit actor]
 Robert Axelrod – Lord Zedd [voice actor]
 Barbara Goodson – Rita Repulsa & Prince Sprocket [voice actor]
 David Stenstrom – King Mondo [voice actor]
 Alex Borstein – Queen Machina [voice actor]
 Kerrigan Mahan – Goldar [voice actor]
 Bob Papenbrook – Rito Revolto [voice actor]
 Erik Frank (deceased) – David Trueheart
 Brad Hawkins – Trey of Triforia [voice actor]
 Tom, Tim, & Ted DiFilippo – Trey of Triforia

Power Rangers Turbo (1997)
 Jason David Frank (deceased) – Tommy Oliver
 Blake Foster – Justin Stewart
 Johnny Yong Bosch – Adam Park
 Nakia Burrise – Tanya Sloan
 Catherine Sutherland – Katherine "Kat" Hillard
 Selwyn Ward – T.J. Johnson
 Roger Velasco – Carlos Vallerte
 Tracy Lynn Cruz – Ashley Hammond
 Patricia Ja Lee – Cassie Chan
 Carol Hoyt – Divatox [ep. 1-25] and Dimitria
 Hilary Shepard Turner – Divatox [ep. 26-45]
 Paul Schrier – Farkas "Bulk" Bulkmeier
 Jason Narvy – Eugene "Skull" Skullovitch
 Gregg Bullock – Jerome Stone
 Katerina Luciani – Alpha 6 [voice actor]
 Derek Stephen Prince – Elgar [voice actor]
 Lex Lang – Rygog [voice actor]
 Scott Page-Pagter – Porto [voice actor]
 David Walsh – Blue Senturion [voice actor]
 Ali Afshar/Alex Todd – Phantom Ranger [voice actor]

Power Rangers in Space (1998) 
 Christopher Khayman Lee – Andros
 Roger Velasco – Carlos Vallerte
 Selwyn Ward – T.J. Johnson
 Tracy Lynn Cruz – Ashley Hammond
 Patricia Ja Lee – Cassie Chan
 Justin Nimmo – Zhane
 Melody Perkins – Astronema / Karone
 Paul Schrier – Farkas "Bulk" Bulkmeier
 Jason Narvy – Eugene "Skull" Skullovitch
 Jack Banning – Professor Phenomenus
 Hilary Shepard Turner – Divatox
 Aloma Wright – Adelle Ferguson
 Wendee Lee – Alpha 6 [voice actor]
 Lex Lang – Ecliptor [voice actor]
 Christopher Cho – Dark Spector [voice actor]
 Steve Kramer – Darkonda [voice actor]

Power Rangers Lost Galaxy (1999)
 Danny Slavin – Leo Corbett
 Reggie Rolle – Damon Henderson
 Archie Kao – Kai Chen
 Cerina Vincent – Maya
 Valerie Vernon – Kendrix Morgan
 Russell Lawrence – Mike Corbett
 Melody Perkins – Karone
 Amy Miller – Trakeena
 Paul Schrier – Farkas "Bulk" Bulkmeier
 Kerrigan Mahan – Magna Defender I [voice actor]
 Wendee Lee – Alpha 6 [voice actor]
 Kim Strauss – Scorpius [voice actor]
 Tom Wyner – Furio [voice actor]
 Derek Stephen Prince – Treacheron [voice actor]
 Bob Papenbrook – Deviot [voice actor]
 David Lodge – Villamax [voice actor]
 Richard Cansino – Kegler [voice actor]
 Mike Lee Reynolds – Captain Mutiny [voice actor]
 Tom Whyte – Commander Stanton

Power Rangers Lightspeed Rescue (2000)
 Sean Cw Johnson – Carter Grayson
 Michael Chaturantabut – Chad Lee
 Keith Robinson – Joel Rawlings
 Sasha Craig – Kelsey Winslow
 Alison MacInnis – Dana Mitchel
 Rhett Fisher – Ryan Mitchell
 Monica Louwerens – Miss Angela Fairweather
 Ron Roggé – Capt. William Mitchell
 Jennifer L. Yen – Vypra
 Diane Salinger – Queen Bansheera [voice actor]
 Michael Forest – Prince Olympius [voice actor]
 Neil Kaplan – Diabolico [voice actor]
 David Lodge – Loki [voice actor]
 Kim Strauss – Jinxer [voice actor]

Power Rangers Time Force (2001)
 Jason Faunt – Alex Drake / Wes Collins
 Michael Copon – Lucas Kendall
 Kevin Kleinberg – Trip Regis
 Deborah Estelle Phillips – Katie Walker
 Erin Cahill – Jennifer "Jen" Scotts
 Daniel Southworth – Eric Myers
 Vernon Wells – Ransik
 Kate Sheldon – Nadira
 Edward Albert(deceased)  – Mr. Albert Collins
 Brianne Siddall – Circuit [voice actor]
 Ken Merckx – Dr. Michael Zaskin
 Eddie Frierson – Frax [voice actor]

Power Rangers Wild Force (2002)
 Ricardo Medina, Jr. – Cole Evans
 Alyson Suzanne Kiperman – Taylor Earhardt
 Phillip Jeanmarie – Max Cooper
 Jessica Rey – Alyssa Enrilé
 Jack Guzman – Danny Delgado
 Phillip Andrew – Merrick Baliton
 Ann Marie Crouch – Princess Shayla
 Ilia Volok – Master Org / Viktor Adler
 Sin Wong – Toxica
 Danny Wayne Stallcup – Jindrax [voice actor]
 Charles Gideon Davis – Animus [suit actor & voice actor]
 Ken Merckx – Nayzor [voice actor]
 Ezra Weisz & Barbara Goodson – Mandilok [voice actors]
 Lex Lang – Zen-Aku [voice actor]

Power Rangers Ninja Storm (2003)
 Pua Magasiva (deceased) – Shane Clarke
 Sally Martin – Tori Hanson
 Glenn McMillan – Waldo "Dustin" Brooks
 Adam Tuominen – Hunter Bradley
 Jorgito Vargas, Jr. – Blake Bradley
 Jason Chan – Cameron "Cam" Watanabe
 Grant McFarland (deceased) – Sensei Watanabe / Lothor
 Katrina Devine – Marah
 Katrina Browne – Kapri
 Megan Nicol – Kelly Halloway
 Peter Rowley – Zurgane [voice actor]
 Bruce Hopkins – Choobo [voice actor]
 Michael Hurst – Vexacus [voice actor]
 Craig Parker – Motodrone [voice actor]
 Jeremy Birchall – Shimazu [voice actor]

Power Rangers Dino Thunder (2004)
 James Napier Robertson – Conner McKnight
 Kevin Duhaney – Ethan James
 Emma Lahana – Kira Ford
 Jason David Frank (deceased) – Dr. Tommy Oliver
 Jeffrey Parazzo – Trent Fernandez-Mercer
 Ismay Johnston – Hayley Ziktor
 Miriama Smith – Elsa / Principal Randall
 Latham Gaines – Mesogog voice actor / Dr. Anton Mercer
 Katrina Devine – Cassidy Cornell
 Tom Hern – Devin Del Valle
 James Gaylyn – Zeltrax [voice actor]

Power Rangers S.P.D. (2005)
 Brandon Jay McLaren – Jack Landors
 Chris Violette – Schuyler "Sky" Tate
 Matt Austin – Bridge Carson
 Monica May – Elizabeth "Z" Delgado
 Alycia Purrott – Sydney "Syd" Drew
 John Tui – Anubis "Doggie" Cruger
 Michelle Langstone – Dr. Kat Manx
 Kelson Henderson – Boom
 Barnie Duncan – Piggy [voice actor]
 Rene Naufahu – Emperor Gruumm [voice actor]
 Josephine Davison – Morgana
 Olivia James-Baird – Mora
 Jim McLarty – Broodwing [voice actor]
 Paul Norell – Supreme Commander Fowler Birdy [voice actor]
 Tandi Wright – Isinia Cruger [voice actor]
 Beth Allen – Ally Samuels
 Gina Varela – Charlie – A-Squad Red Ranger

Power Rangers Mystic Force (2006)
 Firass Dirani – Nick Russell / Bowen
 Richard Brancatisano – Xander Bly
 Melanie Vallejo – Madison "Maddie" Rocca
 Nic Sampson – Charlie "Chip" Thorn
 Angie Diaz – Vida "V" Rocca
 John Tui – Daggeron
 Peta Rutter (deceased) – Udonna
 Chris Graham – Leanbow
 Antonia Prebble – Clare Langtree / The Gatekeeper / Niella
 Barnie Duncan – Toby Slambrook
 Kelson Henderson – Phineas
 Holly Shanahan – Leelee Primvare
 Geoff Dolan – Koragg the Knight Wolf [voice actor]
 Oliver Driver – Jenji [voice actor]
 John Leigh – Octomus the Master [voice actor]
 Donogh Rees – Necrolai [voice actor]
 Andrew Robertt – Morticon [voice actor]
 Stuart Devine – Imperious [voice actor]

Power Rangers Operation Overdrive (2007)
 James Maclurcan – Mackenzie "Mack" Hartford
 Samuell Benta – Will Aston
 Gareth Yuen – Dax Lo
 Caitlin Murphy – Veronica "Ronny" Robinson
 Rhoda Montemayor – Rose Ortiz
 Dwayne Cameron – Tyzonn
 Rod Lousich – Andrew Hartford
 David Weatherley – Spencer & Benglo
 Gerald Urquhart – Flurious [voice actor]
 Kelson Henderson – Norg & Mig [voice actor]
 Ria Vandervis – Miratrix
 Beth Allen – Vella
 Nic Sampson – Sentinel Knight [voice actor]
 Mark Ferguson – Moltor [voice actor]
 Adam Gardiner – Kamdor [voice actor]

Power Rangers Jungle Fury (2008)
 Jason Smith – Casey Rhodes
 Aljin Abella – Theo Martin
 Anna Hutchison – Lily Chilman
 David de Lautour – Robert "RJ" James
 Nikolai Nikolaeff – Dominic "Dom" Hargan
 Sarah Thomson – Fran
 Nathaniel Lees – Master Mao
 Bruce Allpress – Master Phant
 Oliver Driver – Master Swoop
 Paul Gittins – Master Fin
 Stig Eldred – Master Rilla
 Andrew Laing – Master Lope
 Michelle Langstone – Master Guin
 Bede Skinner – Jarrod
 Holly Shanahan – Camille
 Geoff Dolan – Dai Shi [voice actor]
 Cameron Rhodes – Carrnisor [voice actor]
 Elisabeth Easther – Jellica [voice actor]
 Derek Judge – Grizzaka [voice actor]

Power Rangers RPM (2009)
 Eka Darville – Scott Truman
 Ari Boyland – Flynn McAllistair
 Rose McIver – Summer Landsdown
 Milo Cawthorne – Ziggy Grover
 Daniel Ewing – Dillon
 Mike Ginn – Gem
 Li Ming Hu – Gemma
 James Gaylyn – Colonel Mason Truman
 Olivia Tennet – Dr. K
 Adelaide Kane – Tenaya 7/15
 Andrew Liang – Venjix Virus [voice actor]
 Charlie McDermott – General Crunch [voice actor]
 Mark Mitchinson – General Shifter [voice actor]
 Leighton Cardno – General Kilobyte [voice actor]

Power Rangers Samurai & Super Samurai (2011-2012)
 Alex Heartman – Jayden Shiba
 Erika Fong – Mia Watanabe
 Hector David Jr. – Mike Fernandez
 Najee De-Tiege – Kevin Douglas
 Brittany Anne Pirtle – Emily Stewart
 Steven Skyler – Antonio Garcia
 Kimberley Crossman – Lauren Shiba
 Felix Ryan – Spike Skullovitch
 Rene Naufahu – Mentor Ji
 Paul Schrier – Farkas "Bulk" Bulkmeier
 Jeff Szusterman – Master Xandred & Octoroo [voice actor]
 Kate Elliott – Dayu [voice actor]
 Ricardo Medina Jr. "Rick Medina" – Deker
 Derek Judge – Serrator [voice actor]

Power Rangers Megaforce & Super Megaforce (2013-2014)
 Andrew Gray – Troy Burrows
 Ciara Hanna – Gia Moran
 John Mark Loudermilk – Noah Carver
 Christina Masterson – Emma Goodall
 Azim Rizk – Jake Holling
 Cameron Jebo – Orion
 Ian Harcourt – Mr. Burley
 Shailesh Prajapati – Ernie
 Chris Auer – Robo Knight [voice actor]
 Geoff Dolan – Gosei [voice actor]
 Estevez Gillespie – Tensou [voice actor]
 Jason Hood – Vrak [voice actor]
 Stephen Butterworth – Prince Vekar [voice actor]
 Campbell Cooley – Admiral Malkor [voice actor]
 Mark Mitchinson – Creepox [voice actor]
 Rebecca Parr – Levira [voice actor]
 John Leigh – Damaras [voice actor]
 Mark Wright – Argus [voice actor]

Power Rangers Dino Charge & Dino Super Charge (2015-2016)
 Brennan Mejia – Tyler Navarro
 James Davies – Chase Randall
 Yoshi Sudarso – Koda
 Michael Taber – Riley Griffin
 Camille Hyde – Shelby Watkins
 Davi Santos – Sir Ivan of Zandar
 Reuben Turner – James Navarro & Dan Musgrove (voice)
 Jarred Blakiston – Prince Philip III
 Claire Blackwelder – Kendall Morgan
 Alistair Browning (deceased) – Zenowing [voice actor]
 Eve Gordon – Keeper [suit actor]
 Richard Simpson – Keeper [voice actor]
 Paul Harrop – Fury [voice actor]
 Adam Gardiner – Sledge [voice actor]
 Paul Harrop – Fury [voice actor]
 Estevez Gillespie – Wrench & Curio [voice actor]
 Jackie Clarke – Poisandra [voice actor]
 Ryan Carter – Heckyl
 Campbell Cooley – Snide [voice actor]
 Andy Grainger – Lord Arcanon [voice actor]
 Mark Mitchinson – Singe [voice actor]

Power Rangers Ninja Steel & Super Ninja Steel (2017-2018) 
 William Shewfelt – Brody Romero
 Peter Sudarso – Preston Tien
 Nico Greetham – Calvin Maxwell
 Zoë Robins – Hayley Foster
 Chrystiane Lopes – Sarah Thompson
 Jordi Webber – Levi Weston / Aiden Romero
 Byron Coll – Redbot [voice actor]
 Caleb Bendit – Monty
 Chris Reid – Victor Vincent
 Kelson Henderson – Mick Kanic
 Richard Simpson – Galvanax [voice actor]
 Jacque Drew – Madame Odius [voice actor]
 Campbell Cooley – Cosmo Royale & Ripcon [voice actor]
 Marissa Stott – Badonna [voice actor]
 Amanda Billing – Principal Hastings
 Claire Chitham – Mrs. Finch

Power Rangers Beast Morphers (2019-2020) 
 Rorrie D. Travis as Devon Daniels
 Jasmeet Baduwalia as Ravi Shaw
 Jacqueline Scislowski as Zoey Reeves
 Abraham Rodriguez as Nate Silva
 Jamie Linehan as Steel [voice actor]
 Colby Strong as Blaze
 Liana Ramirez as Roxy
 Cosme Flores as Ben Burke
 Kristina Ho as Betty Burke
 Teuila Blakely – Commander Shaw
 Andrew Laing – Evox/Venjix [voice actor]
 Campbell Cooley – Scrozzle [voice actor]
 Kelson Henderson – Cruise [voice actor]
 Charlie McDermott – Smash [voice actor]
 Emmett Skilton – Jax [voice actor]
 Kevin Copeland – Mayor Adam Daniels
 Mark Wright – General Burke

Power Rangers Dino Fury (2021-)
 Russell Curry as Zayto
 Hunter Deno as Amelia Jones
 Kai Moya as Oliver "Ollie" Akana
 Tessa Rao as Isabella "Izzy" Garcia
 Chance Perez as Javier "Javi" Garcia
 Jordon Fite as Aiyon
 
 Shavaughn Ruakere – Dr. Lani Akana
 Blair Strang – Warden Garcia
 Josephine Davison – Solon [voice actress] 
 Kira Josephson – Jane
 Victoria Abbott – J-Borg
Benny Joy Smith as Annie
Noah Paul – Stan
Mayhen Meta – Astronomer
Darien Takle – Madame Indigo 
 Jared Turner – Tarrick/Void Knight  
 Torum Heng – Mucus [voice actress]
 Mark Mitchinson – Boomtower [voice actor]
 Siobhan Marshall – Santaura/Void Queen
 Campbell Cooley – Slyther  [voice actor]

References

Cast members
Lists of actors by American television series